Laphria is a large genus of robber flies found in North America, Europe, and Asia. Species include:

Laphria abdominalis (Walker, 1855) c g
Laphria aberrans Wulp, 1898 c g
Laphria aeatus Walker, 1849 i c g
Laphria aeneiventris Costa, 1857 c g
Laphria affinis Macquart, 1855 i c g b
Laphria aimatis McAtee, 1919 i c g
Laphria aktis McAtee, 1919 i c g b
Laphria albimaculata Macquart, 1838 c g
Laphria albitibialis Macquart, 1847 c g
Laphria alebas Walker, 1849 c g
Laphria alternans Wiedemann, 1828 c g
Laphria altitudinum Bromley, 1924 i c g b
Laphria amabilis Wulp, 1872 c g
Laphria ampla Walker, 1862 c g
Laphria annulata Gimmerthal, 1834 c g
Laphria annulifemur Enderlein, 1914 c g
Laphria anthrax Meigen, 1804 c g
Laphria aperta Walker, 1858 c g
Laphria apila (Bromley, 1951) i c g b
Laphria appendiculata Macquart, 1846 g
Laphria argentata (Wiedemann, 1828)
Laphria argentifera Walker, 1861 c g
Laphria asackeni Wilcox, 1965 i c g b
Laphria assamensis Joseph & Parui, 1981 c g
Laphria astur Osten Sacken, 1877 i c g b
Laphria asturina (Bromley, 1951) i c g b
Laphria atomentosa Oldroyd, 1960 c g
Laphria aurea (Fabricius, 1794) c
Laphria aureola Wulp, 1872 c g
Laphria aureopilosa Ricardo, 1900 c g
Laphria aureus (Fabricius, 1794) c g
Laphria auribasis Walker, 1864 c g
Laphria auricincta Wulp, 1872 c g
Laphria auricomata Hermann, 1914 c g
Laphria auricorpus Hobby, 1948 c g
Laphria aurifera Ricardo, 1925 c g
Laphria auriflua Gerstaecker, 1861 c g
Laphria auroria (Wiedemann, 1828)
Laphria azurea Hermann, 1914 c g
Laphria bancrofti Ricardo, 1913 c g
Laphria barbicrura Rondani, 1875 c g
Laphria basalis Hermann, 1914 c g
Laphria basigutta Walker, 1857 c g
Laphria bella Loew, 1858 c g
Laphria bellifontanea Villeneuve, 1928 c g
Laphria benardi Villeneuve, 1911 c g
Laphria bengalensis (Wiedemann, 1828)
Laphria bernsteinii Wulp, 1872 c g
Laphria bifasciata (Olivier, 1789) c g
Laphria bilykovae Paramonov, 1930 c g
Laphria bimaculata (Walker, 1855) c g
Laphria bipartita Macquart, 1855 c g
Laphria bipenicillata Bigot, 1891 c g
Laphria bomboides Macquart, 1849 c g
Laphria breonii Macquart, 1838 c g
Laphria burnsi Paramonov, 1958 c g
Laphria calvescenta Baker, 1975 i c g
Laphria canis Williston, 1883 i c g b
Laphria carbonaria (Snow, 1896) i c g
Laphria carolinensis Schiner, 1867 i c g
Laphria caspica Hermann, 1906 c g
Laphria champlainii (Walton, 1910) i c g b
Laphria chappuisiana (Enderlein, 1914) c g
Laphria chrysocephala Meigen, 1820 c g
Laphria chrysonota Hermann, 1914 c g
Laphria chrysorhiza Hermann, 1914 c g
Laphria chrysotelus (Walker, 1855) c g
Laphria cinerea (Back, 1904) i c g b
Laphria cingulifera Walker, 1856 c g
Laphria claripennis Bigot, 1878 c g
Laphria coarctata Dufour, 1833 c g
Laphria coerulea Boisduval, 1835 c g
Laphria coerulescens Macquart, 1834 c g
Laphria columbica Walker, 1866 i c g b
Laphria comata White, 1918 c g
Laphria complens Walker, 1859 c g
Laphria completa Walker, 1856 c g
Laphria componens Walker, 1860 c g
Laphria comptissima Walker, 1856 c g
Laphria concludens Walker, 1859 c g
Laphria conopoides (Oldroyd, 1972) c g
Laphria consistens Curran, 1928 c g
Laphria constricta (Walker, 1855) c g
Laphria contristans Hobby, 1948 c g
Laphria contusa Wiedmann, 1828 c g
Laphria coquilletti McAtee, 1919 i
Laphria coquillettii McAtee, 1919 c g b
Laphria ctenoventris Oldroyd, 1970 c g
Laphria cyaneogaster Macquart, 1838 c g
Laphria declarata Walker, 1858 c g
Laphria definita Wulp, 1872 c g
Laphria dentipes Fabricius, 1805 c g
Laphria detecta Walker, 1856 c g
Laphria dichroa Wiedemann, 1828 c g
Laphria dimidiata Macquart, 1846 c g
Laphria dimidiatifemur Oldroyd, 1960 c g
Laphria dira (Walker, 1855) c g
Laphria dispar Coquillett, 1898 c g
Laphria dissimilis Doleschall, 1858 c g
Laphria diversa Wulp, 1881 c g
Laphria divisor (Banks, 1917) i c g b
Laphria divulsa Walker, 1864 c g
Laphria dizonias Loew, 1847 c g
Laphria dorsalis (De Geer, 1776) c g
Laphria doryca (Boisduval, 1835) c g
Laphria egregia Wulp, 1898 c g
Laphria empyrea Gerstaecker, 1861 c g
Laphria engelhardti (Bromley, 1931) i c g b
Laphria ephippium (Fabricius, 1781) c g
Laphria falvifacies Macquart, 1850 c g
Laphria fattigi (Bromley, 1951) i c g
Laphria felis Osten Sacken, 1877 i c g b
Laphria fernaldi (Back, 1904) i c g b
Laphria ferox Williston, 1883 i c g b
Laphria ferruginosa Wulp, 1872 c g
Laphria flagrantissima Walker, 1858 c g
Laphria flammipennis Walker, 1861 c g
Laphria flava (Linnaeus, 1761) c g
Laphria flavescens Macquart, 1838 i c g
Laphria flavicollis Say, 1824 i c g b
Laphria flavidorsum Matsumura, 1916 c g
Laphria flavifacies (Macquart, 1849)
Laphria flavifemorata Macquart, 1850 c g
Laphria flavipes Wiedemann, 1821 c g
Laphria flavipila Macquart, 1834 i c g
Laphria formosana Matsumura, 1916 c g
Laphria fortipes Walker, 1857 c g
Laphria franciscana Bigot, 1878 i c g b
Laphria frommeri Joseph & Parui, 1981 c g
Laphria fulvicrura Rondani, 1875 c g
Laphria fulvipes Ricardo, 1913 c g
Laphria fulvithorax Fabricius, 1805 c g
Laphria furva Wulp, 1898 c g
Laphria fuscata (Joseph & Parui, 1997)
Laphria futilis Wulp, 1872 c g
Laphria galathei Costa, 1857 c g
Laphria georgina Wiedemann, 1821 i c g
Laphria gibbosus (Linnaeus, 1758) c g
Laphria gigas Macquart, 1838 c g
Laphria gilva (Linnaeus, 1758) i c g b
Laphria gilvoides Wulp, 1898 c g
Laphria glauca Enderlein, 1914 c g
Laphria gravipes Wulp, 1872 c g
Laphria grossa (Fabricius, 1775) i c g b
Laphria hakiensis Matsumura, 1916 c g
Laphria hecate Gerstaecker, 1861 c g
Laphria hera Bromley, 1935 c g
Laphria hermanni Meijere, 1924 c g
Laphria hirta Ricardo, 1913 c g
Laphria hirticornis Guerin-Meneville, 1835 c g
Laphria histrionica Wulp, 1872 c g
Laphria hobelias (Oldroyd, 1972) c g
Laphria horrida (Walker, 1855) c g
Laphria howeana Paramonov, 1958 c g
Laphria hradskyi Young, 2008 c g
Laphria huron (Bromley, 1929) i c g b
Laphria ignobilis Wulp, 1872 c g
Laphria imbellis Walker, 1857 c g
Laphria inaurea Walker, 1857 c g
Laphria incivilis Walker, 1856 c g
Laphria index McAtee, 1919 i c g b
Laphria indica Joseph & Parui, 1981 c g
Laphria insignis (Banks, 1917) i c g b
Laphria interrupta Walker, 1856 c g
Laphria iola Bromley, 1935 c g
Laphria ithypyga McAtee, 1919 i c g b
Laphria ivorina Oldroyd, 1968 c g
Laphria janus McAtee, 1919 i c g b
Laphria javana Macquart, 1834 c g
Laphria justa Walker, 1858 c g
Laphria karafutonis Matsumura, 1916 c g
Laphria keralaensis Joseph & Parui, 1981 c g
Laphria kistjakovskiji Paramonov, 1929 c g
Laphria lasipes Wiedemann, 1828 i c g
Laphria lata Macquart, 1850 i c g b
Laphria lateralis Fabricius, 1805 c g
Laphria laterepunctata Macquart, 1838 c g
Laphria lepida Walker, 1856 c g
Laphria leptogaster Perty, 1833 c g
Laphria leucocephala Meigen, 1804 c g
Laphria leucoprocta Wiedemann, 1828 c g
Laphria limbinervis Strobl, 1898 c g
Laphria lobifera Hermann, 1914 c g
Laphria luctuosa Macquart, 1847 c g
Laphria lukinsi Paramonov, 1958 c g
Laphria luteipennis (Macquart, 1848) c g
Laphria luteopilosa Joseph & Parui, 1981 c g
Laphria macquarti (Banks, 1917) i c g b
Laphria macra Bigot, 1859 c g
Laphria manifesta Walker, 1858 c g
Laphria marginalis Williston, 1901 c g
Laphria maynei Janssens, 1953 c g
Laphria melania Bigot, 1878 c g
Laphria melanogaster Wiedemann, 1821 i c g
Laphria mellipes Wiedemann, 1828 c g
Laphria meridionalis Mulsant, 1860 c g
Laphria metalli Walker, 1851 c g
Laphria milvina Bromley, 1929 i c g
Laphria mitsukurii Coquillett, 1898 c g
Laphria motodomariensis Matsumura, 1916 c g
Laphria mulleri Wulp, 1872 c g
Laphria multipunctata Oldroyd, 1974 c g
Laphria nathani Joseph & Parui, 1981 c g
Laphria nigella (Bromley, 1934) i c g
Laphria nigrescens Ricardo, 1925 c g
Laphria nigribimba Bromley, 1935 c g
Laphria nigripennis Meigen, 1820 c g
Laphria nigripes Paramonov, 1929 c g
Laphria nigrohirsuta Lichtwardt, 1809 c g
Laphria nitidula (Fabricius, 1794) c g
Laphria notabilis Walker, 1857 c g
Laphria nusoides Bromley, 1931 c g
Laphria ogasawarensis Matsumura, 1916 c g
Laphria ogumae Matsumura, 1911 c g
Laphria okinawensis (Matsumura, 1916)
Laphria orcus Walker, 1857 c g
Laphria orientalis Joseph & Parui, 1981 c g
Laphria ostensa Walker, 1862 c g
Laphria pacifera (Paramonov, 1958)
Laphria pacifica Paramonov, 1958 c g
Laphria partitor (Banks, 1917) i c g b
Laphria peristalsis (Oldroyd, 1972) c g
Laphria pernigra Wulp, 1872 c g
Laphria philippinensis Enderlein, 1914 c g
Laphria pilipes Macquart, 1834 c g
Laphria plana Walker, 1857 c g
Laphria posticata Say, 1824 i c g b
Laphria praelusia Séguy, 1930 c g
Laphria proxima (Walker, 1855) c g
Laphria puer Doleschall, 1858 c g
Laphria pusilla Wiedemann, 1828 c g
Laphria pyrrhothrix Hermann, 1914 c g
Laphria radicalis Walker, 1857 c g
Laphria rapax Osten Sacken, 1877 i c g
Laphria reginae Paramonov, 1958 c g
Laphria reinwardtii Wiedemann, 1828 c g
Laphria remota Hermann, 1914 c g
Laphria remoto Hermann, 1914 g
Laphria ricardoi Bromley, 1935 c g
Laphria royalensis (Bromley, 1950) i c g
Laphria rubescens Bigot, 1878 c g
Laphria rubidofasciata Wulp, 1872 c g
Laphria rudis Walker, 1856 c g
Laphria rueppelii (Wiedemann, 1828) c g
Laphria rufa Roder, 1887 c g
Laphria ruficauda Williston, 1885 c g
Laphria rufifemorata Macquart, 1846 c g
Laphria rufitibia Oldroyd, 1960 c g
Laphria sackeni (Banks, 1917) c g b
Laphria sacrator Walker, 1849 i c g b
Laphria sadales Walker, 1849 i c g b
Laphria saffrana Fabricius, 1805 i c g b
Laphria sapporensis Matsumura, 1911 c g
Laphria schoutedeni Bromley, 1935 c g
Laphria scorpio McAtee, 1919 i c g b
Laphria scutellata Macquart, 1835 c g
Laphria semifulva Bigot, 1878 c g
Laphria semitecta (Coquillett, 1910) i c g
Laphria sericea Say, 1823 i c g b
Laphria serpentina Bezzi, 1908 c g
Laphria seticrura Rondani, 1875 c g
Laphria sibirica Lehr, 1989 c g
Laphria sicula McAtee, 1919 i c g b
Laphria signatipes Wulp, 1872 c g
Laphria sobria Walker, 1857 c g
Laphria solita Wulp, 1872 c g
Laphria soror Wulp, 1872 c g
Laphria stuckenbergi Oldroyd, 1960 c g
Laphria submetallica Macquart, 1838 c g
Laphria taipinensis (Matsumura, 1916)
Laphria taphia Walker, 1849 c g
Laphria taphius Walker, 1849 c
Laphria telecles Walker, 1849 c g
Laphria terminalis Wulp, 1872 c g
Laphria terraenovae Macquart, 1838 i c g
Laphria thoracica Fabricius, 1805 i c g b
Laphria tibialis Meigen, 1820 c g
Laphria transatlantica Schiner, 1868 c g
Laphria triangularis (Walker, 1855) c g
Laphria tricolor Wulp, 1872 c g
Laphria triligata Walker, 1861 c g
Laphria tristis Doleschall, 1857 c g
Laphria trux McAtee, 1919 i c g b
Laphria unicolor (Williston, 1883) i c g b
Laphria unifascia Walker, 1856 c g
Laphria valparaiensis (Joseph & Parui, 1997)
Laphria varia Loew, 1865 c g
Laphria variana White, 1918 c g
Laphria varipes Bigot, 1878 c g
Laphria venatrix Loew, 1847 c g
Laphria venezuelensis Macquart, 1846 c g
Laphria ventralis Williston, 1885 i c g b
Laphria violacea Macquart, 1846 c g
Laphria virginica (Banks, 1917) i c g b
Laphria vivax Williston, 1883 i c g
Laphria vorax (Bromley, 1929) i c g b
Laphria vulcana Wiedemann, 1828 c
Laphria vulcanus Wiedemann, 1828 c g
Laphria vulpina Meigen, 1820 c g
Laphria vultur Osten Sacken, 1877 i c g b
Laphria walkeri Enderlein, 1914 c g
Laphria willistoniana Enderlein, 1914 c g
Laphria winnemana McAtee, 1919 i c g b
Laphria xanthothrix Hermann, 1914 c g
Laphria yamatonis Matsumura, 1916 c g

Data sources: i = ITIS, c = Catalogue of Life, g = GBIF, b = Bugguide.net

References

L
Laphria